Minna Mustonen (born 26 July 1977) is a Finnish footballer who played as a midfielder. Mustonen represented  the Finnish women's national football team, 67 times and scored 7 goals. Mustonen was also part of the Finnish team at the 2005 European Championships.

She played for the Boston Renegades in 2000 and 2001.

References

External links
Profile at Women's United Soccer Association

1977 births
Living people
Kansallinen Liiga players
Damallsvenskan players
FC United (Jakobstad) players
Helsingin Jalkapalloklubi (women) players
New York Power players
Carolina Courage players
Finnish women's footballers
Finland women's international footballers
Expatriate women's footballers in Sweden
Finnish expatriate footballers
Women's association football midfielders
USL W-League (1995–2015) players
Expatriate women's soccer players in the United States
Boston Renegades players
Women's United Soccer Association players